Egged may refer to:
 Egged, a verb form of egging, being pelted with eggs
 Egged (company) or Egged Israel Transport Cooperative Society Ltd
 Egged Ta'avura, an Israeli bus company, subsidiary of main Egged cooperative
 Operation Egged, an Israeli military operation